Dear John is a 1964 Swedish film directed by Lars-Magnus Lindgren and starring Jarl Kulle and Christina Schollin. The motion picture is known especially for nude scenes unusual in the day, and for a natural performance of them that caused the film considerable notoriety in the United States. It was nominated for the Academy Award for Best Foreign Language Film.

Cast
 Jarl Kulle - John Berndtsson
 Christina Schollin - Anna
 Helena Nilsson - Helena
 Erik Hell - Yngve Lindgren
 Emy Storm - Karin Lindgren
 Morgan Andersson - Raymond
 Synnøve Liljebæck - Dagny
 Hans Wigren - Elon
 Håkan Serner - Erwin
 Bo Wahlström - Bosse
 Erland Nordenfalk - Kurt

See also
 List of submissions to the 38th Academy Awards for Best Foreign Language Film
 List of Swedish submissions for the Academy Award for Best Foreign Language Film

References

External links

1964 films
Swedish romantic drama films
1960s Swedish-language films
Films directed by Lars-Magnus Lindgren
1960s Swedish films